Camilla Katrina Arfwedson (pronounced Arvedson; born 16 October 1981) is an English actress. She is known for her roles as Zosia March, a Core Training (year 2) Doctor in Holby City and being the poster woman for Secret Escapes from 2012-2013.

Early life
Born in Westminster, London, to a Swedish father and English mother, Arfwedson was brought up in Chelsea and attended the Francis Holland School as a day girl. She then studied Classics at the University of Edinburgh. There, she joined the theatre society, and gained parts in the stage plays: Sore Throats and A Slight Ache both directed by Thom Tuck; Skylight directed by Michael Sophocles; Private Lives directed by Frederic Wake-Walker; Bedroom Farce directed by Simon Yadoo; the speaker in the Vagina Monologues directed by Alice Russell.

Career
Becoming a professional actress upon graduation, Arfwedson has since worked mainly in the theatre, including Portia in the Merchant of Venice, the first touring production of Festen, and the role of Evelyn in the Barons Court Theatre production of Neil LaBute's The Shape of Things directed by Ed Behrens.

Arfwedson's television roles have included parts in Law & Order: UK and Agatha Christie's Marple: Murder Is Easy. Her film roles have included playing Lady Charlotte in The Duchess, and playing Burt Reynolds' daughter in the British comedy film A Bunch of Amateurs.

In 2012, Arfwedson starred in a television commercial for travel website Secret Escapes. Follow-up adverts were also released in 2013. She played Sheriff Angela Carter in Wrong Turn 5: Bloodlines, and in 2013, appeared in the second episode of BBC Three sitcom Way to Go, before joining the cast of BBC One medical drama Holby City.

In 2018, Arfwedson played the young Mrs Ayres in Lenny Abrahamson's film version of the novel The Little Stranger; the later life Mrs Ayres was played in the film by Charlotte Rampling.

Filmography

Film

Television

Theatre

Awards and nominations

References

External links 
 

1981 births
Living people
English people of Swedish descent
Alumni of the University of Edinburgh
Actresses from London
English stage actresses
English television actresses
English film actresses
People educated at Francis Holland School
People from Chelsea, London
People from Westminster